Miss India Worldwide 1990 was the first edition of the international female pageant. The total number of contestants is not known. Simi Chaddha  of the United States was crowned as winner at the end of the event.

References

External links
http://www.worldwidepageants.com/

1990 beauty pageants